Kelly Sutton is the NASCAR Camping World Truck Series driver.

Kelly Sutton may also refer to:

Kelly Sutton, fictional character in Once Upon a Texas Train
 Michael Kelly Sutton, software developer, commonly known as Kelly Sutton
Kelly Sutton, entertainment reporter, Grand Ole Opry announcer, and media personality for Amazon Music and WSM, based in Nashville, Tennessee